Smallpox was an infectious disease caused by variola virus (often called smallpox virus)  which belongs to the genus Orthopoxvirus. The last naturally occurring case was diagnosed in October 1977, and the World Health Organization (WHO) certified the global eradication of the disease in 1980, making it the only human disease to be eradicated.

The initial symptoms of the disease included fever and vomiting. This was followed by formation of ulcers in the mouth and a skin rash. Over a number of days, the skin rash turned into the characteristic fluid-filled blisters with a dent in the center. The bumps then scabbed over and fell off, leaving scars. The disease was spread between people or via contaminated objects. Prevention was achieved mainly through the smallpox vaccine. Once the disease had developed, certain antiviral medications could potentially have helped, but such medications did not become available until after the disease was eradicated. The risk of death was about 30%, with higher rates among babies. Often, those who survived had extensive scarring of their skin, and some were left blind.

The earliest evidence of the disease dates to around 1500 BC in Egyptian mummies. The disease historically occurred in outbreaks. In 18th-century Europe, it is estimated that 400,000 people died from the disease per year, and that one-third of all cases of blindness were due to smallpox. Smallpox is estimated to have killed up to 300 million people in the 20th century and around 500 million people in the last 100 years of its existence. Earlier deaths included six European monarchs. As recently as 1967, 15 million cases occurred a year.

Inoculation for smallpox appears to have started in China around the 1500s. Europe adopted this practice from Asia in the first half of the 18th century. In 1796, Edward Jenner introduced the modern smallpox vaccine. In 1967, the WHO intensified efforts to eliminate the disease. Smallpox is one of two infectious diseases to have been eradicated, the other being rinderpest in 2011. The term "smallpox" was first used in England in the 16th century to distinguish the disease from syphilis, which was then known as the "great pox". Other historical names for the disease include pox, speckled monster, and red plague.

Classification 

There are two forms of the smallpox. Variola major is the severe and most common form, with a more extensive rash and higher fever. Variola minor is a less common presentation, causing less severe disease, typically discrete smallpox, with historical death rates of 1% or less. Subclinical (asymptomatic) infections with variola virus were noted but were not common. In addition, a form called variola sine eruptione (smallpox without rash) was seen generally in vaccinated persons. This form was marked by a fever that occurred after the usual incubation period and could be confirmed only by antibody studies or, rarely, by viral culture. In addition, there were two very rare and fulminating types of smallpox, the malignant (flat) and hemorrhagic forms, which were usually fatal.

Signs and symptoms 

The initial symptoms were similar to other viral diseases that are still extant, such as influenza and the common cold: fever of at least , muscle pain, malaise, headache and fatigue. As the digestive tract was commonly involved, nausea, vomiting, and backache often occurred. The early prodromal stage usually lasted 2–4 days. By days 12–15, the first visible lesions – small reddish spots called enanthem – appeared on mucous membranes of the mouth, tongue, palate, and throat, and the temperature fell to near-normal. These lesions rapidly enlarged and ruptured, releasing large amounts of virus into the saliva.

Variola virus tended to attack skin cells, causing the characteristic pimples, or macules, associated with the disease. A rash developed on the skin 24 to 48 hours after lesions on the mucous membranes appeared. Typically the macules first appeared on the forehead, then rapidly spread to the whole face, proximal portions of extremities, the trunk, and lastly to distal portions of extremities. The process took no more than 24 to 36 hours, after which no new lesions appeared. At this point, variola major disease could take several very different courses, which resulted in four types of smallpox disease based on the Rao classification: ordinary, modified, malignant (or flat), and hemorrhagic smallpox. Historically, ordinary smallpox had an overall fatality rate of about 30%, and the malignant and hemorrhagic forms were usually fatal. The modified form was almost never fatal. In early hemorrhagic cases, hemorrhages occurred before any skin lesions developed. The incubation period between contraction and the first obvious symptoms of the disease was 7–14 days.

Ordinary 

At least 90% of smallpox cases among unvaccinated persons were of the ordinary type. In this form of the disease, by the second day of the rash the macules had become raised papules. By the third or fourth day, the papules had filled with an opalescent fluid to become vesicles. This fluid became opaque and turbid within 24–48 hours, resulting in pustules.

By the sixth or seventh day, all the skin lesions had become pustules. Between seven and ten days the pustules had matured and reached their maximum size. The pustules were sharply raised, typically round, tense, and firm to the touch. The pustules were deeply embedded in the dermis, giving them the feel of a small bead in the skin. Fluid slowly leaked from the pustules, and by the end of the second week, the pustules had deflated and began to dry up, forming crusts or scabs. By day 16–20 scabs had formed over all of the lesions, which had started to flake off, leaving depigmented scars.

Ordinary smallpox generally produced a discrete rash, in which the pustules stood out on the skin separately. The distribution of the rash was most dense on the face, denser on the extremities than on the trunk, and denser on the distal parts of the extremities than on the proximal. The palms of the hands and soles of the feet were involved in most cases. Sometimes, the blisters merged into sheets, forming a confluent rash, which began to detach the outer layers of skin from the underlying flesh. Patients with confluent smallpox often remained ill even after scabs had formed over all the lesions. In one case series, the case-fatality rate in confluent smallpox was 62%.

Modified 

Referring to the character of the eruption and the rapidity of its development, modified smallpox occurred mostly in previously vaccinated people. It was rare in unvaccinated people, with one case study showing 1–2% of modified cases compared to around 25% in vaccinated people. In this form, the prodromal illness still occurred but may have been less severe than in the ordinary type. There was usually no fever during the evolution of the rash. The skin lesions tended to be fewer and evolved more quickly, were more superficial, and may not have shown the uniform characteristic of more typical smallpox. Modified smallpox was rarely, if ever, fatal. This form of variola major was more easily confused with chickenpox.

Malignant 

In malignant-type smallpox (also called flat smallpox) the lesions remained almost flush with the skin at the time when raised vesicles would have formed in the ordinary type. It is unknown why some people developed this type. Historically, it accounted for 5–10% of cases, and most (72%) were children. Malignant smallpox was accompanied by a severe prodromal phase that lasted 3–4 days, prolonged high fever, and severe symptoms of viremia. The prodromal symptoms continued even after the onset of the rash. The rash on the mucous membranes (enanthem) was extensive. Skin lesions matured slowly, were typically confluent or semi-confluent, and by the seventh or eighth day, they were flat and appeared to be buried in the skin. Unlike ordinary-type smallpox, the vesicles contained little fluid, were soft and velvety to the touch, and may have contained hemorrhages. Malignant smallpox was nearly always fatal and death usually occurred between the 8th and 12th day of illness. Often, a day or two before death, the lesions turned ashen gray, which, along with abdominal distension, was a bad prognostic sign. This form is thought to be caused by deficient cell-mediated immunity to smallpox. If the person recovered, the lesions gradually faded and did not form scars or scabs.

Hemorrhagic 
Hemorrhagic smallpox is a severe form accompanied by extensive bleeding into the skin, mucous membranes, gastrointestinal tract, and viscera. This form develops in approximately 2% of infections and occurs mostly in adults. Pustules do not typically form in hemorrhagic smallpox. Instead, bleeding occurs under the skin, making it look charred and black, hence this form of the disease is also referred to as variola nigra or "black pox". Hemorrhagic smallpox has very rarely been caused by variola minor virus. While bleeding may occur in mild cases and not affect outcomes, hemorrhagic smallpox is typically fatal. Vaccination does not appear to provide any immunity to either form of hemorrhagic smallpox and some cases even occurred among people that were revaccinated shortly before. It has two forms.

Early 

The early or fulminant form of hemorrhagic smallpox (referred to as purpura variolosa) begins with a prodromal phase characterized by a high fever, severe headache, and abdominal pain. The skin becomes dusky and erythematous, and this is rapidly followed by the development of petechiae and bleeding in the skin, conjunctiva and mucous membranes. Death often occurs suddenly between the fifth and seventh days of illness, when only a few insignificant skin lesions are present. Some people survive a few days longer, during which time the skin detaches and fluid accumulates under it, rupturing at the slightest injury. People are usually conscious until death or shortly before. Autopsy reveals petechiae and bleeding in the spleen, kidney, serous membranes, skeletal muscles, pericardium, liver, gonads and bladder. Historically, this condition was frequently misdiagnosed, with the correct diagnosis made only at autopsy. This form is more likely to occur in pregnant women than in the general population (approximately 16% of cases in unvaccinated pregnant women were early hemorrhagic smallpox, versus roughly 1% in nonpregnant women and adult males). The case fatality rate of early hemorrhagic smallpox approaches 100%.

Late 
There is also a later form of hemorrhagic smallpox (referred to late hemorrhagic smallpox, or variolosa pustula hemorrhagica). The prodrome is severe and similar to that observed in early hemorrhagic smallpox, and the fever persists throughout the course of the disease. Bleeding appears in the early eruptive period (but later than that seen in purpura variolosa), and the rash is often flat and does not progress beyond the vesicular stage. Hemorrhages in the mucous membranes appear to occur less often than in the early hemorrhagic form. Sometimes the rash forms pustules which bleed at the base and then undergo the same process as in ordinary smallpox. This form of the disease is characterized by a decrease in all of the elements of the coagulation cascade and an increase in circulating antithrombin. This form of smallpox occurs anywhere from 3% to 25% of fatal cases, depending on the virulence of the smallpox strain. Most people with the late-stage form die within eight to 10 days of illness. Among the few who recover, the hemorrhagic lesions gradually disappear after a long period of convalescence. The case fatality rate for late hemorrhagic smallpox is around 90–95%. Pregnant women are slightly more likely to experience this form of the disease, though not as much as early hemorrhagic smallpox.

Cause 

Smallpox was caused by infection with variola virus, which belongs to the family Poxviridae, subfamily Chordopoxvirinae, and genus Orthopoxvirus.

Evolution 
The date of the appearance of smallpox is not settled. It most probably evolved from a terrestrial African rodent virus between 68,000 and 16,000 years ago. The wide range of dates is due to the different records used to calibrate the molecular clock. One clade was the variola major strains (the more clinically severe form of smallpox) which spread from Asia between 400 and 1,600 years ago. A second clade included both alastrim (a phenotypically mild smallpox) described from the American continents and isolates from West Africa which diverged from an ancestral strain between 1,400 and 6,300 years before present. This clade further diverged into two subclades at least 800 years ago.

A second estimate has placed the separation of variola  virus from Taterapox (an Orthopoxvirus of some African rodents including gerbils) at 3,000 to 4,000 years ago. This is consistent with archaeological and historical evidence regarding the appearance of smallpox as a human disease which suggests a relatively recent origin. If the mutation rate is assumed to be similar to that of the herpesviruses, the divergence date of variola virus from Taterapox has been estimated to be 50,000 years ago. While this is consistent with the other published estimates, it suggests that the archaeological and historical evidence is very incomplete. Better estimates of mutation rates in these viruses are needed.

Examination of a strain that dates from c. 1650 found that this strain was basal to the other presently sequenced strains. The mutation rate of this virus is well modeled by a molecular clock. Diversification of strains only occurred in the 18th and 19th centuries.

Virology 
Variola virus is  large and brick-shaped and is approximately 302 to 350 nanometers by 244 to 270 nm, with a single linear double stranded DNA genome 186 kilobase pairs (kbp) in size and containing a hairpin loop at each end.

Four orthopoxviruses cause infection in humans: variola, vaccinia, cowpox, and monkeypox. Variola virus infects only humans in nature, although primates and other animals have been infected in an experimental setting. Vaccinia, cowpox, and monkeypox viruses can infect both humans and other animals in nature.

The life cycle of poxviruses is complicated by having multiple infectious forms, with differing mechanisms of cell entry. Poxviruses are unique among human DNA viruses in that they replicate in the cytoplasm of the cell rather than in the nucleus. To replicate, poxviruses produce a variety of specialized proteins not produced by other DNA viruses, the most important of which is a viral-associated DNA-dependent RNA polymerase.

Both enveloped and unenveloped virions are infectious. The viral envelope is made of modified Golgi membranes containing viral-specific polypeptides, including hemagglutinin. Infection with either variola major virus or variola minor virus confers immunity against the other.

Variola major 
The more common, infectious form of the disease was caused by the variola major virus strain.

Variola minor 
Variola minor virus, also called alastrim, was a less common form of the virus, and much less deadly. Although variola minor had the same incubation period and pathogenetic stages as smallpox, it is believed to have had a mortality rate of less than 1%, as compared to smallpox's 30%. Like variola major, variola minor was spread through inhalation of the virus in the air, which could occur through face-to-face contact or through fomites. Infection with variola minor virus conferred immunity against the more dangerous variola major virus.

Because variola minor was a less debilitating disease than smallpox, people were more frequently ambulant and thus able to infect others more rapidly. As such, variola minor swept through the United States, Great Britain, and South Africa in the early 20th century, becoming the dominant form of the disease in those areas and thus rapidly decreasing mortality rates. Along with variola major, the minor form has now been totally eradicated from the globe. The last case of indigenous variola minor was reported in a Somali cook, Ali Maow Maalin, in October 1977, and smallpox was officially declared eradicated worldwide in May 1980. Variola minor was also called white pox, kaffir pox, Cuban itch, West Indian pox, milk pox, and pseudovariola.

Genome composition 
The genome of variola major virus is about 186,000 base pairs in length. It is made from linear double stranded DNA and contains the coding sequence for about 200 genes. The genes are usually not overlapping and typically occur in blocks that point towards the closer terminal region of the genome. The coding sequence of the central region of the genome is highly consistent across orthopoxviruses, and the arrangement of genes is consistent across chordopoxviruses

The center of the variola virus genome contains the majority of the essential viral genes, including the genes for structural proteins, DNA replication, transcription, and mRNA synthesis. The ends of the genome vary more across strains and species of orthopoxviruses. These regions contain proteins that modulate the hosts' immune systems, and are primarily responsible for the variability in virulence across the orthopoxvirus family. These terminal regions in poxviruses are inverted terminal repetitions (ITR) sequences. These sequences are identical but oppositely oriented on either end of the genome, leading to the genome being a continuous loop of DNA Components of the ITR sequences include an incompletely base paired A/T rich hairpin loop, a region of roughly 100 base pairs necessary for resolving concatomeric DNA (a stretch of DNA containing multiple copies of the same sequence), a few open reading frames, and short tandemly repeating sequences of varying number and length. The ITRs of poxviridae vary in length across strains and species. The coding sequence for most of the viral proteins in variola major virus have at least 90% similarity with the genome of vaccinia, a related virus used for vaccination against smallpox.

Gene expression 
Gene expression of variola virus occurs entirely within the cytoplasm of the host cell, and follows a distinct progression during infection. After entry of an infectious virion into a host cell, synthesis of viral mRNA can be detected within 20 minutes. About half of the viral genome is transcribed prior to the replication of viral DNA. The first set of expressed genes are transcribed by pre-existing viral machinery packaged within the infecting virion. These genes encode the factors necessary for viral DNA synthesis and for transcription of the next set of expressed genes. Unlike most DNA viruses, DNA replication in variola virus and other poxviruses takes place within the cytoplasm of the infected cell. The exact timing of DNA replication after infection of a host cell varies across the poxviridae. Recombination of the genome occurs within actively infected cells. Following the onset of viral DNA replication, an intermediate set of genes codes for transcription factors of late gene expression. The products of the later genes include transcription factors necessary for transcribing the early genes for new virions, as well as viral RNA polymerase and other essential enzymes for new viral particles. These proteins are then packaged into new infectious virions capable of infecting other cells.

Research 
Two live samples of variola major virus remain, one in the United States at the CDC in Atlanta, and one at the Vector Institute in Koltsovo, Russia. Research with the remaining virus samples is tightly controlled, and each research proposal must be approved by the WHO and the World Health Assembly (WHA). Most research on poxviruses is performed using the closely related Vaccinia virus as a model organism. Vaccinia virus, which is used to vaccinate for smallpox, is also under research as a viral vector for vaccines for unrelated diseases.

The genome of variola major virus was first sequenced in its entirety in the 1990s. The complete coding sequence is publicly available online.The current reference sequence for variola major virus was sequenced from a strain that circulated in India in 1967. In addition, there are sequences for samples of other strains that were collected during the WHO eradication campaign. A genome browser for a complete database of annotated sequences of variola virus and other poxviruses is publicly available through the Viral Bioinformatics Resource Center.

Genetic engineering 
The WHO currently bans genetic engineering of the variola virus. However, in 2004, a committee advisory to the WHO voted in favor of allowing editing of the genome of the two remaining samples of variola major virus to add a marker gene. This gene, called GFP, or green fluorescent protein, would cause live samples of the virus to glow green under fluorescent light. The insertion of this gene, which would not influence the virulence of the virus, would be the only allowed modification of the genome. The committee stated the proposed modification would aid in research of treatments by making it easier to assess whether a potential treatment was effective in killing viral samples. The recommendation could only take effect if approved by the WHA. When the WHA discussed the proposal in 2005, it refrained from taking a formal vote on the proposal, stating that it would review individual research proposals one at a time. Addition of the GFP gene to the Vaccinia genome is routinely performed during research on the closely related Vaccinia virus.

Controversies 
The public availability of the variola virus complete sequence has raised concerns about the possibility of illicit synthesis of infectious virus. Vaccinia, a cousin of the variola virus, was artificially synthesized in 2002 by NIH scientists. They used a previously established method that involved using a recombinant viral genome to create a self-replicating bacterial plasmid that produced viral particles.

In 2016, another group synthesized the horsepox virus using publicly available sequence data for horsepox. The researchers argued that their work would be beneficial to creating a safer and more effective vaccine for smallpox, although an effective vaccine is already available. The horsepox virus had previously seemed to have gone extinct, raising concern about potential revival of variola major and causing other scientists to question their motives. Critics found it especially concerning that the group was able to recreate viable virus in a short time frame with relatively little cost or effort. Although the WHO bans individual laboratories from synthesizing more than 20% of the genome at a time, and purchases of smallpox genome fragments are monitored and regulated, a group with malicious intentions could compile, from multiple sources, the full synthetic genome necessary to produce viable virus.

Transmission 
Transmission occurred through inhalation of airborne variola virus, usually droplets expressed from the oral, nasal, or pharyngeal mucosa of an infected person. Rarely, smallpox was spread by virus carried in the air in enclosed settings such as buildings, buses, and trains. The virus can cross the placenta, but the incidence of congenital smallpox was relatively low. Smallpox was not notably infectious in the prodromal period and viral shedding was usually delayed until the appearance of the rash, which was often accompanied by lesions in the mouth and pharynx. The virus can be transmitted throughout the course of the illness, but this happened most frequently during the first week of the rash when most of the skin lesions were intact. Infectivity waned in 7 to 10 days when scabs formed over the lesions, but the infected person was contagious until the last smallpox scab fell off.

Smallpox was highly contagious, but generally spread more slowly and less widely than some other viral diseases, perhaps because transmission required close contact and occurred after the onset of the rash. The overall rate of infection was also affected by the short duration of the infectious stage. In temperate areas, the number of smallpox infections was highest during the winter and spring. In tropical areas, seasonal variation was less evident and the disease was present throughout the year. Age distribution of smallpox infections depended on acquired immunity. Vaccination immunity declined over time and was probably lost within thirty years. Smallpox was not known to be transmitted by insects or animals and there was no asymptomatic carrier state.

Mechanism 
Once inhaled, the variola virus invaded the mucus membranes of the mouth, throat, and respiratory tract. From there, it migrated to regional lymph nodes and began to multiply. In the initial growth phase, the virus seemed to move from cell to cell, but by around the 12th day, widespread lysis of infected cells occurred and the virus could be found in the bloodstream in large numbers, a condition known as viremia. This resulted in the second wave of multiplication in the spleen, bone marrow, and lymph nodes.

Diagnosis 
The clinical definition of ordinary smallpox is an illness with acute onset of fever equal to or greater than  followed by a rash characterized by firm, deep-seated vesicles or pustules in the same stage of development without other apparent cause. When a clinical case was observed, smallpox was confirmed using laboratory tests.

Microscopically, poxviruses produce characteristic cytoplasmic inclusion bodies, the most important of which are known as Guarnieri bodies, and are the sites of viral replication. Guarnieri bodies are readily identified in skin biopsies stained with hematoxylin and eosin, and appear as pink blobs. They are found in virtually all poxvirus infections but the absence of Guarnieri bodies could not be used to rule out smallpox. The diagnosis of an orthopoxvirus infection can also be made rapidly by electron microscopic examination of pustular fluid or scabs. All orthopoxviruses exhibit identical brick-shaped virions by electron microscopy. If particles with the characteristic morphology of herpesviruses are seen this will eliminate smallpox and other orthopoxvirus infections.

Definitive laboratory identification of variola virus involved growing the virus on chorioallantoic membrane (part of a chicken embryo) and examining the resulting pock lesions under defined temperature conditions. Strains were characterized by polymerase chain reaction (PCR) and restriction fragment length polymorphism (RFLP) analysis. Serologic tests and enzyme linked immunosorbent assays (ELISA), which measured variola virus-specific immunoglobulin and antigen were also developed to assist in the diagnosis of infection.

Chickenpox was commonly confused with smallpox in the immediate post-eradication era. Chickenpox and smallpox could be distinguished by several methods. Unlike smallpox, chickenpox does not usually affect the palms and soles. Additionally, chickenpox pustules are of varying size due to variations in the timing of pustule eruption: smallpox pustules are all very nearly the same size since the viral effect progresses more uniformly. A variety of laboratory methods were available for detecting chickenpox in the evaluation of suspected smallpox cases.

Prevention 

The earliest procedure used to prevent smallpox was inoculation with variola minor virus (a method later known as variolation after the introduction of smallpox vaccine to avoid possible confusion), which likely occurred in India, Africa, and China well before the practice arrived in Europe. The idea that inoculation originated in India has been challenged, as few of the ancient Sanskrit medical texts described the process of inoculation. Accounts of inoculation against smallpox in China can be found as early as the late 10th century, and the procedure was widely practiced by the 16th century, during the Ming dynasty. If successful, inoculation produced lasting immunity to smallpox. Because the person was infected with variola virus, a severe infection could result, and the person could transmit smallpox to others. Variolation had a 0.5–2 percent mortality rate, considerably less than the 20–30 percent mortality rate of the disease. Two reports on the Chinese practice of inoculation were received by the Royal Society in London in 1700; one by Dr. Martin Lister who received a report by an employee of the East India Company stationed in China and another by Clopton Havers.

Lady Mary Wortley Montagu observed smallpox inoculation during her stay in the Ottoman Empire, writing detailed accounts of the practice in her letters, and enthusiastically promoted the procedure in England upon her return in 1718. According to Voltaire (1742), the Turks derived their use of inoculation from neighbouring Circassia. Voltaire does not speculate on where the Circassians derived their technique from, though he reports that the Chinese have practiced it "these hundred years". In 1721, Cotton Mather and colleagues provoked controversy in Boston by inoculating hundreds. After publishing The present method of inoculating for the small-pox in 1767, Dr Thomas Dimsdale was invited to Russia to variolate the Empress Catherine the Great of Russia and her son, Grand Duke Paul, which he successfully did in 1768. In 1796, Edward Jenner, a doctor in Berkeley, Gloucestershire, rural England, discovered that immunity to smallpox could be produced by inoculating a person with material from a cowpox lesion. Cowpox is a poxvirus in the same family as variola. Jenner called the material used for inoculation vaccine from the root word vacca, which is Latin for cow. The procedure was much safer than variolation and did not involve a risk of smallpox transmission. Vaccination to prevent smallpox was soon practiced all over the world. During the 19th century, the cowpox virus used for smallpox vaccination was replaced by the vaccinia virus. Vaccinia is in the same family as cowpox and variola virus but is genetically distinct from both. The origin of the vaccinia virus and how it came to be in the vaccine are not known.

The current formulation of the smallpox vaccine is a live virus preparation of the infectious vaccinia virus. The vaccine is given using a bifurcated (two-pronged) needle that is dipped into the vaccine solution. The needle is used to prick the skin (usually the upper arm) several times in a few seconds. If successful, a red and itchy bump develops at the vaccine site in three or four days. In the first week, the bump becomes a large blister (called a "Jennerian vesicle") which fills with pus and begins to drain. During the second week, the blister begins to dry up, and a scab forms. The scab falls off in the third week, leaving a small scar.

The antibodies induced by the vaccinia vaccine are cross-protective for other orthopoxviruses, such as monkeypox, cowpox, and variola (smallpox) viruses. Neutralizing antibodies are detectable 10 days after first-time vaccination and seven days after revaccination. Historically, the vaccine has been effective in preventing smallpox infection in 95 percent of those vaccinated. Smallpox vaccination provides a high level of immunity for three to five years and decreasing immunity thereafter. If a person is vaccinated again later, the immunity lasts even longer. Studies of smallpox cases in Europe in the 1950s and 1960s demonstrated that the fatality rate among persons vaccinated less than 10 years before exposure was 1.3 percent; it was 7 percent among those vaccinated 11 to 20 years prior, and 11 percent among those vaccinated 20 or more years before infection. By contrast, 52 percent of unvaccinated persons died.

There are side effects and risks associated with the smallpox vaccine. In the past, about 1 out of 1,000 people vaccinated for the first time experienced serious, but non-life-threatening, reactions, including toxic or allergic reaction at the site of the vaccination (erythema multiforme), spread of the vaccinia virus to other parts of the body, and spread to other individuals. Potentially life-threatening reactions occurred in 14 to 500 people out of every 1 million people vaccinated for the first time. Based on past experience, it is estimated that 1 or 2 people in 1 million (0.000198 percent) who receive the vaccine may die as a result, most often the result of postvaccinial encephalitis or severe necrosis in the area of vaccination (called progressive vaccinia).

Given these risks, as smallpox became effectively eradicated and the number of naturally occurring cases fell below the number of vaccine-induced illnesses and deaths, routine childhood vaccination was discontinued in the United States in 1972 and was abandoned in most European countries in the early 1970s. Routine vaccination of health care workers was discontinued in the U.S. in 1976, and among military recruits in 1990 (although military personnel deploying to the Middle East and Korea still receive the vaccination). By 1986, routine vaccination had ceased in all countries. It is now primarily recommended for laboratory workers at risk for occupational exposure. However, the possibility of variola virus being used as a biological weapon has rekindled interest in the development of newer vaccines. The smallpox vaccine is also effective in, and therefore administered for, the prevention of monkeypox.

Treatment 
Smallpox vaccination within three days of exposure will prevent or significantly lessen the severity of smallpox symptoms in the vast majority of people. Vaccination four to seven days after exposure can offer some protection from disease or may modify the severity of the disease. Other than vaccination, treatment of smallpox is primarily supportive, such as wound care and infection control, fluid therapy, and possible ventilator assistance. Flat and hemorrhagic types of smallpox are treated with the same therapies used to treat shock, such as fluid resuscitation. People with semi-confluent and confluent types of smallpox may have therapeutic issues similar to patients with extensive skin burns.

In July 2018, the Food and Drug Administration approved tecovirimat, the first drug approved for treatment of smallpox. Antiviral treatments have improved since the last large smallpox epidemics, and studies suggest that the antiviral drug cidofovir might be useful as a therapeutic agent. The drug must be administered intravenously, and may cause serious kidney toxicity.

ACAM2000 is a smallpox vaccine developed by Acambis. It was approved for use in the United States by the U.S. FDA on August 31, 2007. It contains live vaccinia virus, cloned from the same strain used in an earlier vaccine, Dryvax. While the Dryvax virus was cultured in the skin of calves and freeze-dried, ACAM2000s virus is cultured in kidney epithelial cells (Vero cells) from an African green monkey. Efficacy and adverse reaction incidence are similar to Dryvax. The vaccine is not routinely available to the US public; it is, however, used in the military and maintained in the Strategic National Stockpile.

In June 2021, brincidofovir was approved for medical use in the United States for the treatment of human smallpox disease caused by variola virus.

Prognosis 

The mortality rate from variola minor is approximately 1%, while the mortality rate from variola major is approximately 30%.

Ordinary type-confluent is fatal about 50–75% of the time, ordinary-type semi-confluent about 25–50% of the time, in cases where the rash is discrete the case-fatality rate is less than 10%. The overall fatality rate for children younger than 1 year of age is 40–50%. Hemorrhagic and flat types have the highest fatality rates. The fatality rate for flat or late hemorrhagic type smallpox is 90% or greater and nearly 100% is observed in cases of early hemorrhagic smallpox. The case-fatality rate for variola minor is 1% or less. There is no evidence of chronic or recurrent infection with variola virus. In cases of flat smallpox in vaccinated people, the condition was extremely rare but less lethal, with one case series showing a 66.7% death rate.

In fatal cases of ordinary smallpox, death usually occurs between days 10-16 of the illness. The cause of death from smallpox is not clear, but the infection is now known to involve multiple organs. Circulating immune complexes, overwhelming viremia, or an uncontrolled immune response may be contributing factors. In early hemorrhagic smallpox, death occurs suddenly about six days after the fever develops. The cause of death in early hemorrhagic cases is commonly due to heart failure and pulmonary edema. In late hemorrhagic cases, high and sustained viremia, severe platelet loss and poor immune response were often cited as causes of death. In flat smallpox modes of death are similar to those in burns, with loss of fluid, protein and electrolytes, and fulminating sepsis.

Complications 
Complications of smallpox arise most commonly in the respiratory system and range from simple bronchitis to fatal pneumonia. Respiratory complications tend to develop on about the eighth day of the illness and can be either viral or bacterial in origin. Secondary bacterial infection of the skin is a relatively uncommon complication of smallpox. When this occurs, the fever usually remains elevated.

Other complications include encephalitis (1 in 500 patients), which is more common in adults and may cause temporary disability; permanent pitted scars, most notably on the face; and complications involving the eyes (2% of all cases). Pustules can form on the eyelid, conjunctiva, and cornea, leading to complications such as conjunctivitis, keratitis, corneal ulcer, iritis, iridocyclitis, and atrophy of the optic nerve. Blindness results in approximately 35-40% of eyes affected with keratitis and corneal ulcer. Hemorrhagic smallpox can cause subconjunctival and retinal hemorrhages. In 2-5% of young children with smallpox, virions reach the joints and bone, causing osteomyelitis variolosa. Bony lesions are symmetrical, most common in the elbows, legs, and characteristically cause separation of the epiphysis and marked periosteal reactions. Swollen joints limit movement, and arthritis may lead to limb deformities, ankylosis, malformed bones, flail joints, and stubby fingers.

Between 65 and 80% of survivors are marked with deep pitted scars (pockmarks), most prominent on the face.

History

Disease emergence 

The earliest credible clinical evidence of smallpox is found in the descriptions of smallpox-like disease in medical writings from ancient India (as early as 1500 BCE), and China (1122 BCE), as well as a study of the Egyptian mummy of Ramses V, who died more than 3000 years ago (1145 BCE). It has been speculated that Egyptian traders brought smallpox to India during the 1st millennium BCE, where it remained as an endemic human disease for at least 2000 years. Smallpox was probably introduced into China during the 1st century CE from the southwest, and in the 6th century was carried from China to Japan. In Japan, the epidemic of 735–737 is believed to have killed as much as one-third of the population. At least seven religious deities have been specifically dedicated to smallpox, such as the god Sopona in the Yoruba religion in West Africa. In India, the Hindu goddess of smallpox, Shitala, was worshipped in temples throughout the country.

A different viewpoint is that smallpox emerged 1588 CE and the earlier reported cases were incorrectly identified as smallpox.

The timing of the arrival of smallpox in Europe and south-western Asia is less clear. Smallpox is not clearly described in either the Old or New Testaments of the Bible or in the literature of the Greeks or Romans. While some have identified the Plague of Athens – which was said to have originated in "Ethiopia" and Egypt – or the plague that lifted Carthage's 396 BCE siege of Syracuse – with smallpox, many scholars agree it is very unlikely such a serious disease as variola major would have escaped being described by Hippocrates if it had existed in the Mediterranean region during his lifetime.

While the Antonine Plague that swept through the Roman Empire in 165180 CE may have been caused by smallpox, Saint Nicasius of Rheims became the patron saint of smallpox victims for having supposedly survived a bout in 450, and Saint Gregory of Tours recorded a similar outbreak in France and Italy in 580, the first use of the term variola. Other historians speculate that Arab armies first carried smallpox from Africa into Southwestern Europe during the 7th and 8th centuries. In the 9th century the Persian physician, Rhazes, provided one of the most definitive descriptions of smallpox and was the first to differentiate smallpox from measles and chickenpox in his Kitab fi al-jadari wa-al-hasbah (The Book of Smallpox and Measles). During the Middle Ages several smallpox outbreaks occurred in Europe. However, smallpox had not become established there until the population growth and mobility marked by the Crusades allowed it to do so. By the 16th century, smallpox had become entrenched across most of Europe, where it had a mortality rate as high as 30 percent. This endemic occurrence of smallpox in Europe is of particular historical importance, as successive exploration and colonization by Europeans tended to spread the disease to other nations. By the 16th century, smallpox had become a predominant cause of morbidity and mortality throughout much of the world.

There were no credible descriptions of smallpox-like disease in the Americas before the westward exploration by Europeans in the 15th century CE. Smallpox was introduced into the Caribbean island of Hispaniola in 1507, and into the mainland in 1520, when Spanish settlers from Hispaniola arrived in Mexico, inadvertently carrying smallpox with them. Because the native Amerindian population had no acquired immunity to this new disease, their peoples were decimated by epidemics. Such disruption and population losses were an important factor in the Spanish achieving conquest of the Aztecs and the Incas. Similarly, English settlement of the east coast of North America in 1633 in Plymouth, Massachusetts was accompanied by devastating outbreaks of smallpox among Native American populations, and subsequently among the native-born colonists. Case fatality rates during outbreaks in Native American populations were as high as 90%. Smallpox was introduced into Australia in 1789 and again in 1829, though colonial surgeons, who by 1829 were attempting to distinguish between smallpox and chickenpox (which could be almost equally fatal to Aborigines), were divided as to whether the 1829–1830 epidemic was chickenpox or smallpox. Although smallpox was never endemic on the continent, it has been described as the principal cause of death in Aboriginal populations between 1780 and 1870.

By the mid-18th century, smallpox was a major endemic disease everywhere in the world except in Australia and small islands untouched by outside exploration. In 18th century Europe, smallpox was a leading cause of death, killing an estimated 400,000 Europeans each year. Up to 10 percent of Swedish infants died of smallpox each year, and the death rate of infants in Russia might have been even higher. The widespread use of variolation in a few countries, notably Great Britain, its North American colonies, and China, somewhat reduced the impact of smallpox among the wealthy classes during the latter part of the 18th century, but a real reduction in its incidence did not occur until vaccination became a common practice toward the end of the 19th century. Improved vaccines and the practice of re-vaccination led to a substantial reduction in cases in Europe and North America, but smallpox remained almost unchecked everywhere else in the world. By the mid-20th century, variola minor occurred along with variola major, in varying proportions, in many parts of Africa. Patients with variola minor experience only a mild systemic illness, are often ambulant throughout the course of the disease, and are therefore able to more easily spread disease. Infection with variola minor virus induces immunity against the more deadly variola major form. Thus, as variola minor spread all over the US, into Canada, the South American countries, and Great Britain, it became the dominant form of smallpox, further reducing mortality rates.

Eradication 

The first clear reference to smallpox inoculation was made by the Chinese author Wan Quan (1499–1582) in his  ("Pox Rash Teachings") published in 1549, with earliest hints of the practice in China during the 10th century. In China, powdered smallpox scabs were blown up the noses of the healthy. People would then develop a mild case of the disease and from then on were immune to it. The technique did have a 0.5–2.0% mortality rate, but that was considerably less than the 20–30% mortality rate of the disease itself. Two reports on the Chinese practice of inoculation were received by the Royal Society in London in 1700; one by Dr. Martin Lister who received a report by an employee of the East India Company stationed in China and another by Clopton Havers. Voltaire (1742) reports that the Chinese had practiced smallpox inoculation "these hundred years". Variolation had also been witnessed in Turkey by Lady Mary Wortley Montagu, who later introduced it in the UK.

An early mention of the possibility of smallpox's eradication was made in reference to the work of Johnnie Notions, a self-taught inoculator from Shetland, Scotland. Notions found success in treating people from at least the late 1780s through a method devised by himself despite having no formal medical background. His method involved exposing smallpox pus to peat smoke, burying it in the ground with camphor for up to 8 years, and then inserting the matter into a person's skin using a knife, and covering the incision with a cabbage leaf. He was reputed not to have lost a single patient. Arthur Edmondston, in writings on Notions' technique that were published in 1809, stated, "Had every practitioner been as uniformly successful in the disease as he was, the small-pox might have been banished from the face of the earth, without injuring the system, or leaving any doubt as to the fact."

The English physician Edward Jenner demonstrated the effectiveness of cowpox to protect humans from smallpox in 1796, after which various attempts were made to eliminate smallpox on a regional scale. In Russia in 1796, the first child to receive this treatment was bestowed the name "Vaccinov" by Catherine the Great, and was educated at the expense of the nation.

The introduction of the vaccine to the New World took place in Trinity, Newfoundland in 1800 by Dr. John Clinch, boyhood friend and medical colleague of Jenner. As early as 1803, the Spanish Crown organized the Balmis expedition to transport the vaccine to the Spanish colonies in the Americas and the Philippines, and establish mass vaccination programs there. The U.S. Congress passed the Vaccine Act of 1813 to ensure that safe smallpox vaccine would be available to the American public. By about 1817, a robust state vaccination program existed in the Dutch East Indies.

On August 26, 1807, Bavaria became the first country in the world to introduce compulsory vaccinations. Baden followed in 1809, Prussia in 1815, Württemberg in 1818, Sweden in 1816 and the German Empire in 1874 through the Reichs Vaccination Act. In Lutheran Sweden, the Protestant clergy played a pioneering role in voluntary smallpox vaccination as early as 1800. The first vaccination was carried out in Liechtenstein in 1801, and from 1812 it was mandatory to vaccinate.

In British India a program was launched to propagate smallpox vaccination, through Indian vaccinators, under the supervision of European officials. Nevertheless, British vaccination efforts in India, and in Burma in particular, were hampered by indigenous preference for inoculation and distrust of vaccination, despite tough legislation, improvements in the local efficacy of the vaccine and vaccine preservative, and education efforts. By 1832, the federal government of the United States established a smallpox vaccination program for Native Americans. In 1842, the United Kingdom banned inoculation, later progressing to mandatory vaccination. The British government introduced compulsory smallpox vaccination by an Act of Parliament in 1853.

In the United States, from 1843 to 1855, first Massachusetts and then other states required smallpox vaccination. Although some disliked these measures, coordinated efforts against smallpox went on, and the disease continued to diminish in the wealthy countries. In Northern Europe a number of countries had eliminated smallpox by 1900, and by 1914, the incidence in most industrialized countries had decreased to comparatively low levels.

Vaccination continued in industrialized countries as protection against reintroduction until the mid to late 1970s. Australia and New Zealand are two notable exceptions; neither experienced endemic smallpox and never vaccinated widely, relying instead on protection by distance and strict quarantines.

The first hemisphere-wide effort to eradicate smallpox was made in 1950 by the Pan American Health Organization. The campaign was successful in eliminating smallpox from all countries of the Americas except Argentina, Brazil, Colombia, and Ecuador. In 1958 Professor Viktor Zhdanov, Deputy Minister of Health for the USSR, called on the World Health Assembly to undertake a global initiative to eradicate smallpox. The proposal (Resolution WHA11.54) was accepted in 1959. At this point, 2 million people were dying from smallpox every year. Overall, the progress towards eradication was disappointing, especially in Africa and in the Indian subcontinent. In 1966 an international team, the Smallpox Eradication Unit, was formed under the leadership of an American, Donald Henderson. In 1967, the World Health Organization intensified the global smallpox eradication by contributing $2.4 million annually to the effort, and adopted the new disease surveillance method promoted by Czech epidemiologist Karel Raška.

In the early 1950s, an estimated 50 million cases of smallpox occurred in the world each year. To eradicate smallpox, each outbreak had to be stopped from spreading, by isolation of cases and vaccination of everyone who lived close by. This process is known as "ring vaccination". The key to this strategy was the monitoring of cases in a community (known as surveillance) and containment.

The initial problem the WHO team faced was inadequate reporting of smallpox cases, as many cases did not come to the attention of the authorities. The fact that humans are the only reservoir for smallpox infection and that carriers did not exist played a significant role in the eradication of smallpox. The WHO established a network of consultants who assisted countries in setting up surveillance and containment activities. Early on, donations of vaccine were provided primarily by the Soviet Union and the United States, but by 1973, more than 80 percent of all vaccine was produced in developing countries. The Soviet Union provided one and a half billion doses between 1958 and 1979, as well as the medical staff.

The last major European outbreak of smallpox was in 1972 in Yugoslavia, after a pilgrim from Kosovo returned from the Middle East, where he had contracted the virus. The epidemic infected 175 people, causing 35 deaths. Authorities declared martial law, enforced quarantine, and undertook widespread re-vaccination of the population, enlisting the help of the WHO. In two months, the outbreak was over. Prior to this, there had been a smallpox outbreak in May–July 1963 in Stockholm, Sweden, brought from the Far East by a Swedish sailor; this had been dealt with by quarantine measures and vaccination of the local population.

By the end of 1975, smallpox persisted only in the Horn of Africa. Conditions were very difficult in Ethiopia and Somalia, where there were few roads. Civil war, famine, and refugees made the task even more difficult. An intensive surveillance and containment and vaccination program was undertaken in these countries in early and mid-1977, under the direction of Australian microbiologist Frank Fenner. As the campaign neared its goal, Fenner and his team played an important role in verifying eradication. The last naturally occurring case of indigenous smallpox (variola minor) was diagnosed in Ali Maow Maalin, a hospital cook in Merca, Somalia, on 26 October 1977. The last naturally occurring case of the more deadly variola major had been detected in October 1975 in a three-year-old Bangladeshi girl, Rahima Banu.

The global eradication of smallpox was certified, based on intense verification activities, by a commission of eminent scientists on 9 December 1979 and subsequently endorsed by the World Health Assembly on 8 May 1980. The first two sentences of the resolution read:

Costs and benefits 
The cost of the eradication effort, from 1967 to 1979, was roughly US$300 million. Roughly a third came from the developed world, which had largely eradicated smallpox decades earlier. The United States, the largest contributor to the program, has reportedly recouped that investment every 26 days since in money not spent on vaccinations and the costs of incidence.

Post-eradication 

The last case of smallpox in the world occurred in an outbreak in the United Kingdom in 1978. A medical photographer, Janet Parker, contracted the disease at the University of Birmingham Medical School and died on 11 September 1978. Although it has remained unclear how Parker became infected, the source of the infection was established to be the variola virus grown for research purposes at the Medical School laboratory. All known stocks of smallpox worldwide were subsequently destroyed or transferred to two WHO-designated reference laboratories with BSL-4 facilities – the United States' Centers for Disease Control and Prevention (CDC) and the Soviet Union's (now Russia's) State Research Center of Virology and Biotechnology VECTOR.

WHO first recommended destruction of the virus in 1986 and later set the date of destruction to be 30 December 1993. This was postponed to 30 June 1999. Due to resistance from the U.S. and Russia, in 2002 the World Health Assembly agreed to permit the temporary retention of the virus stocks for specific research purposes. Destroying existing stocks would reduce the risk involved with ongoing smallpox research; the stocks are not needed to respond to a smallpox outbreak. Some scientists have argued that the stocks may be useful in developing new vaccines, antiviral drugs, and diagnostic tests; a 2010 review by a team of public health experts appointed by WHO concluded that no essential public health purpose is served by the U.S. and Russia continuing to retain virus stocks. The latter view is frequently supported in the scientific community, particularly among veterans of the WHO Smallpox Eradication Program.

On March 31, 2003, smallpox scabs were found inside an envelope in an 1888 book on Civil War medicine in Santa Fe, New Mexico. The envelope was labeled as containing scabs from a vaccination and gave scientists at the CDC an opportunity to study the history of smallpox vaccination in the United States.

On July 1, 2014, six sealed glass vials of smallpox dated 1954, along with sample vials of other pathogens, were discovered in a cold storage room in an FDA laboratory at the National Institutes of Health location in Bethesda, Maryland. The smallpox vials were subsequently transferred to the custody of the CDC in Atlanta, where virus taken from at least two vials proved viable in culture. After studies were conducted, the CDC destroyed the virus under WHO observation on February 24, 2015.

In 2017, Canadian scientists recreated an extinct horse pox virus to demonstrate that the variola virus can be recreated in a small lab at a cost of about $100,000, by a team of scientists without specialist knowledge. This makes the retention controversy irrelevant since the virus can be easily recreated even if all samples are destroyed. Although the scientists performed the research to help development of new vaccines as well as trace smallpox's history, the possibility of the techniques being used for nefarious purposes was immediately recognized, raising questions on dual use research and regulations.

In September 2019, the Russian lab housing smallpox samples experienced a gas explosion that injured one worker. It did not occur near the virus storage area, and no samples were compromised, but the incident prompted a review of risks to containment.

Society and culture

Biological warfare 

In 1763, Pontiac's War broke out as a Native American confederacy led by Pontiac attempted to counter British control over the Great Lakes region. A group of Native American warriors laid siege to British-held Fort Pitt on June 22. In response, Henry Bouquet, the commander of the fort, ordered his subordinate Simeon Ecuyer to give smallpox-infested blankets from the infirmary to a Delaware delegation outside the fort. Bouquet had discussed this with his superior, Sir Jeffrey Amherst, who wrote to Bouquet stating: "Could it not be contrived to send the small pox among the disaffected tribes of Indians? We must on this occasion use every stratagem in our power to reduce them." Bouquet agreed with the proposal, writing back that "I will try to inocculate  the Indians by means of Blankets that may fall in their hands". On 24 June 1763, William Trent, a local trader and commander of the Fort Pitt militia, wrote, "Out of our regard for them, we gave them two Blankets and an Handkerchief out of the Small Pox Hospital. I hope it will have the desired effect." The effectiveness of this effort to broadcast the disease is unknown. There are also accounts that smallpox was used as a weapon during the American Revolutionary War (1775–1783).

According to a theory put forward in Journal of Australian Studies (JAS) by independent researcher Christopher Warren, Royal Marines used smallpox in 1789 against indigenous tribes in New South Wales. This theory was also considered earlier in Bulletin of the History of Medicine and by David Day. However it is disputed by some medical academics, including Professor Jack Carmody, who in 2010 claimed that the rapid spread of the outbreak in question was more likely indicative of chickenpox—a more infectious disease which, at the time, was often confused, even by surgeons, with smallpox, and may have been comparably deadly to Aborigines and other peoples without natural immunity to it. Carmody noted that in the 8-month voyage of the First Fleet and the following 14 months there were no reports of smallpox amongst the colonists and that, since smallpox has an incubation period of 10–12 days, it is unlikely it was present in the First Fleet; however, Warren argued in the JAS article that the likely source was bottles of variola virus possessed by First Fleet surgeons. Ian and Jennifer Glynn, in The life and death of smallpox, confirm that bottles of "variolous matter" were carried to Australia for use as a vaccine, but think it unlikely the virus could have survived till 1789. In 2007, Christopher Warren offered evidence that the British smallpox may have been still viable. However, the only non-Aborigine reported to have died in this outbreak was a seaman called Joseph Jeffries, who was recorded as being of "American Indian" origin.

W. S. Carus, an expert in biological weapons, has written that there is circumstantial evidence that smallpox was deliberately introduced to the Aboriginal population. However Carmody and the Australian National University's Boyd Hunter continue to support the chickenpox hypothesis. In a 2013 lecture at the Australian National University, Carmody pointed out that chickenpox, unlike smallpox, was known to be present in the Sydney Cove colony. He also suggested that all c. 18th century (and earlier) identifications of smallpox outbreaks were dubious because: "surgeons … would have been unaware of the distinction between smallpox and chickenpox – the latter having traditionally been considered a milder form of smallpox."

During World War II, scientists from the United Kingdom, United States, and Japan (Unit 731 of the Imperial Japanese Army) were involved in research into producing a biological weapon from smallpox. Plans of large scale production were never carried through as they considered that the weapon would not be very effective due to the wide-scale availability of a vaccine.

In 1947, the Soviet Union established a smallpox weapons factory in the city of Zagorsk, 75 km to the northeast of Moscow. An outbreak of weaponized smallpox occurred during testing at a facility on an island in the Aral Sea in 1971. General Prof. Peter Burgasov, former Chief Sanitary Physician of the Soviet Army and a senior researcher within the Soviet program of biological weapons, described the incident:

Others contend that the first patient may have contracted the disease while visiting Uyaly or Komsomolsk-on-Ustyurt, two cities where the boat docked.

Responding to international pressures, in 1991 the Soviet government allowed a joint U.S.–British inspection team to tour four of its main weapons facilities at Biopreparat. The inspectors were met with evasion and denials from the Soviet scientists and were eventually ordered out of the facility. In 1992, Soviet defector Ken Alibek alleged that the Soviet bioweapons program at Zagorsk had produced a large stockpile – as much as twenty tons – of weaponized smallpox (possibly engineered to resist vaccines, Alibek further alleged), along with refrigerated warheads to deliver it. Alibek's stories about the former Soviet program's smallpox activities have never been independently verified.

In 1997, the Russian government announced that all of its remaining smallpox samples would be moved to the Vector Institute in Koltsovo. With the breakup of the Soviet Union and unemployment of many of the weapons program's scientists, U.S. government officials have expressed concern that smallpox and the expertise to weaponize it may have become available to other governments or terrorist groups who might wish to use virus as means of biological warfare. Specific allegations made against Iraq in this respect proved to be false.

Concern has been expressed by some that artificial gene synthesis could be used to recreate the virus from existing digital genomes, for use in biological warfare. Insertion of the synthesized smallpox DNA into existing related pox viruses could theoretically be used to recreate the virus. The first step to mitigating this risk, it has been suggested, should be to destroy the remaining virus stocks to enable unequivocal criminalization of any possession of the virus.

Notable cases 

Famous historical figures who contracted smallpox include Lakota Chief Sitting Bull, Ramses V, the Kangxi Emperor (survived), Shunzhi Emperor and Tongzhi Emperor of China, Emperor Komei of Japan (died of smallpox in 1867), and Date Masamune of Japan (who lost an eye to the disease). Cuitláhuac, the 10th tlatoani (ruler) of the Aztec city of Tenochtitlan, died of smallpox in 1520, shortly after its introduction to the Americas, and the Incan emperor Huayna Capac died of it in 1527 (causing a civil war of succession in the Inca empire and the eventual conquest by the Spaniards). More recent public figures include Guru Har Krishan, 8th Guru of the Sikhs, in 1664, Louis I of Spain in 1724 (died), Peter II of Russia in 1730 (died), George Washington (survived), Louis XV of France in 1774 (died) and Maximilian III Joseph of Bavaria in 1777 (died).

Prominent families throughout the world often had several people infected by and/or perish from the disease. For example, several relatives of Henry VIII of England survived the disease but were scarred by it. These include his sister Margaret, his wife Anne of Cleves, and his two daughters: Mary I in 1527 and Elizabeth I in 1562. Elizabeth tried to disguise the pockmarks with heavy makeup. Mary, Queen of Scots, contracted the disease as a child but had no visible scarring.

In Europe, deaths from smallpox often changed dynastic succession. Louis XV of France succeeded his great-grandfather Louis XIV through a series of deaths of smallpox or measles among those higher in the succession line. He himself died of the disease in 1774. Peter II of Russia died of the disease at 14 years of age. Also, before becoming emperor, Peter III of Russia caught the virus and suffered greatly from it. He was left scarred and disfigured. His wife, Catherine the Great, was spared but fear of the virus clearly had its effects on her. She feared for the safety of her son, Paul, so much that she made sure that large crowds were kept at bay and sought to isolate him. Eventually, she decided to have herself inoculated by a British doctor, Thomas Dimsdale. While this was considered a controversial method at the time, she succeeded. Paul was later inoculated as well. Catherine then sought to have inoculations throughout her empire stating: "My objective was, through my example, to save from death the multitude of my subjects who, not knowing the value of this technique, and frightened of it, were left in danger." By 1800, approximately two million inoculations had been administered in the Russian Empire.

In China, the Qing dynasty had extensive protocols to protect Manchus from Peking's endemic smallpox.

U.S. Presidents George Washington, Andrew Jackson, and Abraham Lincoln all contracted and recovered from the disease. Washington became infected with smallpox on a visit to Barbados in 1751. Jackson developed the illness after being taken prisoner by the British during the American Revolution, and though he recovered, his brother Robert did not. Lincoln contracted the disease during his presidency, possibly from his son Tad, and was quarantined shortly after giving the Gettysburg address in 1863.

The famous theologian Jonathan Edwards died of smallpox in 1758 following an inoculation.

Soviet leader Joseph Stalin fell ill with smallpox at the age of seven. His face was badly scarred by the disease. He later had photographs retouched to make his pockmarks less apparent.

Hungarian poet Ferenc Kölcsey, who wrote the Hungarian national anthem, lost his right eye to smallpox.

Tradition and religion 

In the face of the devastation of smallpox, various smallpox gods and goddesses have been worshipped throughout parts of the Old World, for example in China and India. In China, the smallpox goddess was referred to as T'ou-Shen Niang-Niang. In a related New Year's Eve custom it was prescribed that the children of the house wear ugly masks while sleeping, so as to conceal any beauty and thereby avoid attracting the goddess, who would be passing through sometime that night. If a case of smallpox did occur, shrines would be set up in the homes of the victims, to be worshipped and offered to as the disease ran its course. If the victim recovered, the shrines were removed and carried away in a special paper chair or boat for burning. If the patient did not recover, the shrine was destroyed and cursed, to expel the goddess from the house.

In the Yoruba language smallpox is known as ṣọpọná, but it was also written as shakpanna, shopona, ṣhapana, and ṣọpọnọ. The word is a combination of 3 words, the verb ṣán, meaning to cover or plaster (referring to the pustules characteristic of smallpox), kpa or pa, meaning to kill, and enia, meaning human. Roughly translated, it means One who kills a person by covering them with pustules. Among the Yorùbá people of West Africa, and also in Dahomean religion, Trinidad, and in Brazil, The deity Sopona, also known as Obaluaye, is the deity of smallpox and other deadly diseases (like leprosy, HIV/AIDS, and fevers). One of the most feared deities of the orisha pantheon, smallpox was seen as a form of punishment from Shopona. Worship of Shopona was highly controlled by his priests, and it was believed that priests could also spread smallpox when angered. However, Shopona was also seen as a healer who could cure the diseases he inflicted, and he was often called upon his victims to heal them. The British government banned the worship of the god because it was believed his priests were purposely spreading smallpox to their opponents.

India's first records of smallpox can be found in a medical book that dates back to 400 CE. This book describes a disease that sounds exceptionally like smallpox. India, like China and the Yorùbá, created a goddess in response to its exposure to smallpox. The Hindu goddess Shitala was both worshipped and feared during her reign. It was believed that this goddess was both evil and kind and had the ability to inflict victims when angered, as well as calm the fevers of the already affected. Portraits of the goddess show her holding a broom in her right hand to continue to move the disease and a pot of cool water in the other hand in an attempt to soothe patients. Shrines were created where many Indian natives, both healthy and not, went to worship and attempt to protect themselves from this disease. Some Indian women, in an attempt to ward off Shitala, placed plates of cooling foods and pots of water on the roofs of their homes.

In cultures that did not recognize a smallpox deity, there was often nonetheless a belief in smallpox demons, who were accordingly blamed for the disease. Such beliefs were prominent in Japan, Europe, Africa, and other parts of the world. Nearly all cultures who believed in the demon also believed that it was afraid of the color red. This led to the invention of the so-called red treatment, where patients and their rooms would be decorated in red. The practice spread to Europe in the 12th century and was practiced by (among others) Charles V of France and Elizabeth I of England. Afforded scientific credibility through the studies by Niels Ryberg Finsen showing that red light reduced scarring, this belief persisted even until the 1930s.

See also 
 List of epidemics
 Population history of indigenous peoples of the Americas#Depopulation from disease

References

Further reading 

 
 Henderson, Donald Ainslie. Smallpox: the death of a disease: the inside story of eradicating a worldwide killer. Prometheus Books, 2009.

External links 

 Smallpox Biosafety: A Website About Destruction of Smallpox Virus Stocks
 Detailed CIDRAP Smallpox overview 
 Agent Fact Sheet: Smallpox, Center for Biosecurity
 Smallpox Images and Diagnosis Synopsis 
 Virus Pathogen Database and Analysis Resource (ViPR): Poxviridae
 Episode 1 (of 4): Vaccines of the BBC Four and PBS show: Extra Life: A Short History of Living Longer (2021)

 
Chordopoxvirinae
Eradicated diseases
Virus-related cutaneous conditions
Wikipedia medicine articles ready to translate